Hedley David Farquhar (3 March 1927 – 22 June 2009) was an Australian politician.

He was born in Launceston. In 1972 he was elected to the Tasmanian House of Assembly as a Labor member for Bass. He was appointed a minister in 1974, but he lost his seat in 1976.

References

1927 births
2009 deaths
Members of the Tasmanian House of Assembly
Australian Labor Party members of the Parliament of Tasmania
20th-century Australian politicians